Uamh an Claonaite (Scottish Gaelic: Cave of the sloping rock) is the longest cave in Scotland.  It consists of a series of dry passages and a series of at least six sumps which have been dived over the years.

The attempt by members of the Grampian Speleological Group to excavate a nearby sinkhole, Rana Hole, and connect into the final chambers from above achieved its aim in December 2007.

References

External links
 http://www.wirralcavinggroup.uk.eu.org/trips/uac.html
 http://www.sat.dundee.ac.uk/arb/scotland/assynt.html
 http://www.darkanddeep.co.uk/caving_scotland.asp

Caves of Scotland
Limestone caves
Wild caves
Protected areas of Highland (council area)
Underwater diving sites in Scotland